Reuben Harrison Hunt (February 2, 1862 – May 28, 1937), also known as R. H. Hunt, was an American architect who spent most of his life in Chattanooga, Tennessee. He is considered to have been one of the city's most significant early architects. He also designed major public building projects in other states.  He was a principal of the R.H. Hunt and Co. firm.

He came to Chattanooga in 1882 and within four years had established a successful architectural firm.  Hunt designed a number of Chattanooga's homes and public buildings, including the Soldiers and Sailors Memorial Auditorium  (1922), the Joel W. Solomon Federal Building and U.S. Courthouse (1934) with Shreve, Lamb and Harmon,  the Hamilton County, Tennessee Courthouse (1912), the James (1907) and Maclellan (1924) buildings, the Carnegie Library (1905) and the St. John's Hotel (1915).

Hunt also designed churches throughout the South. This included well-known Chattanooga churches such as Second Presbyterian Church and First Baptist Church, as well as The Tabernacle in Atlanta.  Numerous works by Hunt are preserved and listed on the National Register of Historic Places, 21 of which are covered in one 1979 survey study.

The U.S. Post Office and Courthouse in Chattanooga, Tennessee, built 1932–1933, was Hunt's last major work.  Hunt designed every major public building constructed in Chattanooga between 1895 and 1935. He was also the architect of local churches, hospitals, and private office buildings, as well as similar public and private buildings throughout the South.  In 1938 the Chattanooga building was recognized by the American Institute of Architects as one of the 150 finest buildings constructed in the previous twenty years in the United States, and it was featured in an AIA photographic exhibit in America and Europe.

Works 
Projects credited to Hunt or his firm include (with attribution): 
Alexandria Hall-Louisiana College, Louisiana College, Pineville, LA (Hunt, R.H., Co.) NRHP-listed
Austin Avenue Methodist Episcopal South Church, 1300 Austin Ave, Waco, TX (Hunt, R.H.) NRHP-listed
Brainerd Junior High, 4201 Cherryton Dr., Chattanooga, TN (Hunt, Reuben Harrison) NRHP-listed
Courthouse in Cadiz Downtown Historic District, Cadiz, KY (Hunt, R.H.) NRHP-listed
Central United Methodist Church, 27 Church Street, Asheville, NC (Hunt, Reuben H.)
Central United Methodist Church, 201 E. Third Ave., Knoxville, TN (Hunt, R.H. and Co.) NRHP-listed
Chattanooga Bank Building, 8th St., Chattanooga, TN (Hunt, Reuben Harrison) NRHP-listed
Chattanooga Car Barns, 301 Market St., Chattanooga, TN (Hunt, R.H.) NRHP-listed
Chattanooga Electric Railway, 211-241 Market St., Chattanooga, TN (Hunt, Reuben Harrison) NRHP-listed
Court Street Baptist Church, Portsmouth, VA.
Elbert County Courthouse, Courthouse Sq., Elberton, GA (Hunt, R.H.) NRHP-listed
Fifth Avenue Baptist Church, 1135 Fifth Avenue, Huntington, WV (Hunt, R. H.)
First Baptist Church, 2201 6th Avenue North, Birmingham, AL (Hunt, R.H.) destroyed
First Baptist Church, Durham, NC (Hunt, Reuben Harrison)
First Baptist Church, 538 Linden Ave., Memphis, TN (Hunt, R.H.) NRHP-listed
First Baptist Church, 418 E. Bute St., Norfolk, VA (Hunt, Reuben H.) NRHP-listed
First Baptist Church, 119 29th St., Newport News, VA NRHP-listed
First Baptist Church Education Building, 317 Oak St., Chattanooga, TN (Hunt, Reuben Harrison) NRHP-listed
First Methodist Church of Greenwood, 310 W. Washington St., Greenwood, MS (Hunt, Reuben Harris) NRHP-listed
First Presbyterian Church, AR 79B, Fordyce, AR (Hunt, Reuben Harrison) NRHP-listed
First Presbyterian Church, 300 E. Main, El Dorado, AR (Hunt, R. H., & Associates) NRHP-listed
First United Methodist Church, 309 Church St. NW, Lenoir, NC,
First United Methodist Church of Ensley, 1921 Avenue G, Birmingham, AL (Hunt, R. H.)
Fountain Square, 600–622 Georgia Ave. and 317 Oak St., Chattanooga, TN (Hunt, R.H.) NRHP-listed
Grove, E. W. Henry County High School, Grove Blvd., Paris, TN (Hunt, R. H.) NRHP-listed
Hamilton County Courthouse, W. 6th St. and Georgia Ave., Chattanooga, TN 	(Hunt, R.H.) NRHP-listed
Henderson Hall, Tennessee Technological University, Dixie Ave., Cookeville, TN (Hunt, Reuben H.,& Co.)
Henry County Courthouse, Court Square, Paris, TN (1896)
Highland Park Methodist Episcopal Church, Bailey Ave., Chattanooga, TN (Hunt, Reuben Harrison) NRHP-listed
James Building, 735 Broad St., Chattanooga, TN (Hunt, Rueben Harrison) NRHP-listed
Joel W. Solomon Federal Building and U.S. Courthouse (Hunt, R.H., Shreve, Lamb and Harmon) (1934)
Kimsey Junior College, 244 TN 68, Ducktown, TN (Hunt, R.H.) NRHP-listed
Lander College Old Main Building, Stanley Ave. and Lander St., Greenwood, SC (Hunt, Reuben Harrison) NRHP-listed
Lawrence County Courthouse, N. side Broad St. between Jefferson and Washington Sts., Monticello, MS (Hunt, Reuben) NRHP-listed
Lenoir Presbyterian Church, 1002 Kirkwood St., Lenoir, NC (Hunt, R. H.)
Lookout Mountain Hotel (1927), now Carter Hall on Covenant College campus. NRHP-listed in 2019.
Maclellan Building, 721 Broad St., Chattanooga, TN (Hunt, R.H.) NRHP-listed
McFarlin Memorial Auditorium, 6405 Hillcrest Rd., Dallas, TX (Hunt, R.H.) NRHP-listed
Medical Arts Building (Chattanooga, Tennessee), McCallie Ave., Chattanooga, TN (Hunt, Reuben Harrison) NRHP-listed
Miller Brothers Department Store, 629 Market St., Chattanooga, TN (Hunt, Reuben H.) NRHP-listed
Montgomery Hall, Mississippi State University campus, Starkville, MS (Hunt, R.H.) NRHP-listed
Municipal Building, E. 11th St., Chattanooga, TN (Hunt, Reuben Harrison) NRHP-listed
Nathan L. Bachman School, 281 Anderson Pike, Walden, TN (Hunt, R.H. & Co.) NRHP-listed
North Alexander School, North Alexander Avenue, Washington, GA 30673
Northside Presbyterian Church, 923 Mississippi Ave., Chattanooga, TN (Hunt, Reuben Harrison) NRHP-listed, the one known Greek Revival work by Hunt in Hamilton County
Old Library Building, 200 E. 8th St., Chattanooga, TN (Hunt, Reuben Harrison) NRHP-listed
Polk County Courthouse, Bounded by US 411 and Ward, Commerce and Main Sts., Benton, TN (Hunt, R.H. & Co. et al.) NRHP-listed
Polk Street Methodist Church, 1401 S. Polk St., Amarillo, TX (Hunt, R.H., Co.) NRHP-listed
Second Presbyterian Church, 700 Pine St. 	Chattanooga 	TN (Hunt, Reuben Harrison) NRHP-listed
Soldiers and Sailors Memorial Auditorium, McCallie Ave., Chattanooga, TN (Hunt, Reuben Harrison) NRHP-listed (1922)
Southside Baptist Church, 1016 19th St. South, Birmingham, AL (Hunt, R.H.)
Third Baptist Church, 527 Allen St., Owensboro, KY (Hunt, R.H.) 1896
Tivoli Theater, 709 Broad St., Chattanooga, TN (Hunt, Reuben Harrison) NRHP-listed
Trinity Methodist Episcopal Church, McCallie Ave. 	Chattanooga 	TN (Hunt, Reuben Harrison) NRHP-listed
Frances Willard House, 615 Lindsay St., Chattanooga, TN (Hunt, Reuben Harrison) NRHP-listed
University Baptist Church, 102 S. Columbia St., Chapel Hill, NC (Hunt, Reuben H.)
Wisteria Hotel, Central Ave., Winona, MS (Hunt, R.H. & Co.) NRHP-listed
Wyatt Hall, 865 E. Third St., Chattanooga, TN (Hunt, Reuben H.) NRHP-listed
One or more works in Missionary Ridge Historic District, N. and S. Crest Rd. from Delong Reservation to 700 S. Crest Rd., Chattanooga, TN (Hunt, Reuben Harrison) NRHP-listed
One or more works in Paris Commercial Historic District, Along sections of E. and W. Wood, W. Washington, N. and S. Poplar, N. and S. Market, Fentress and W. Blythe Sts., Paris, TN (Hunt, Rueben H.) NRHP-listed
One or more works in South Main Street Historic District, 200–422 S. Main St., Pikeville, TN (Hunt, R. H.) NRHP-listed
One or more works in Winona Commercial Historic District, Roughly bounded by Magnolia St., Central Ave., Carrollton St. and Sterling Ave., Winona, MS (Hunt, R. H.) NRHP-listed

References

External links
Cornerstones, Inc.
R.H. Hunt's buildings at Emporis

1862 births
1937 deaths
Architects from Tennessee
People from Chattanooga, Tennessee
People from Elbert County, Georgia
Architects from Georgia (U.S. state)
National Sculpture Society members